"Supercute" is a song by Prince, released as a CD single sold only during his 2001 U.S. tour.  The cover art for the single features then backing singer and dancer, Geneva.  The song was reportedly one of the tracks from the cancelled High album.  The B-side, "Underneath the Cream" was also from the High sessions.

References
 Uptown: The Vault – The Definitive Guide to the Musical World of Prince: Nilsen Publishing 2004, 

2001 singles
Prince (musician) songs
Songs written by Prince (musician)
Song recordings produced by Prince (musician)
2000 songs